WLIB (1190 AM) is an urban contemporary gospel radio station licensed to New York, New York. WLIB is owned by Emmis Communications, along with sister stations WBLS (107.5 FM) and WQHT (97.1 FM). The three stations share studios in the Hudson Square neighborhood of lower Manhattan, and WLIB's transmitter is located in Lyndhurst, New Jersey.

History
The station's origins reach back to December 1941, when WCNW went on the air from Brooklyn. Sharing time with WWRL on 1600 kHz, WCNW was granted permission to move down the dial to 1190 kHz. The station, which broadcast foreign language programs, was purchased by Elias Godofsky, who was its general manager, in 1942. It was Godofsky who would change the call letters to the present WLIB. The station's target audience was upper middle-class and wealthy New Yorkers, as evidenced by its format of classical music and popular standards which competed with WQXR.  The station was purchased by New York Post publisher Dorothy Schiff in 1944 and regularly ran news updates from the Posts newsroom at various times during the day.

In 1949 WLIB was purchased by the New Broadcasting Company. The firm was headed by former WNYC executive Morris S. Novik and his brother, garment executive Harry Novik. Upon taking control of the station the Novik brothers turned WLIB into a station which served ethnic audiences, with large amounts of programming targeting the city's Jewish, and African American communities. The station eventually became the leading voice of New York's black residents and established a presence in the community's epicenter with studios at "Harlem Radio Center" in the Hotel Theresa in Harlem. During the mid-to-late 1950s its airstaff included pioneering black radio disc jockey Hal Jackson, actor William Marshall, and Victor Bozeman, who would later become a Los Angeles-based staff announcer for NBC television. Journalists Bill McCreary, and Gil Noble also got their start in WLIB's news department, before each made the leap to television in the mid-1960s.

In the 1960s WLIB was one of several commercial jazz stations in New York, among its disc jockeys was Billy Taylor. During much of this period WLIB's primary competition came from WWRL, another station which programmed to Black audiences.

WLIB became Black-owned in the 1970s after activists picketed the station and demanded African Americans be given a chance to purchase it. Many felt the station's series of white owners didn't care about broadcasting with community concerns in mind. Percy Sutton, Malcolm X’s former attorney and then-Manhattan borough president, formed the Inner City Broadcasting Corporation (ICBC) with the backing of a group of Black investors (including Hal Jackson and Billy Taylor), and purchased WLIB from the Novik brothers in 1972. The station's first talk shows featured Betty Shabazz, widow of Malcolm X, and Dr. Carlos Russell, a noted former college professor who taught some of the Black and Latino students who later founded the Young Lords.

Increased signal power
The station's nighttime power was increased to 30,000 watts in the early 2000s, in a swap with WOWO in Fort Wayne, Indiana, which also broadcasts on 1190 AM.  Prior to the power increase, WLIB was classified as a "limited time" station operating during daytime hours (NYC sunrise until sunset at Fort Wayne) only, deferring at night to WOWO's 50,000-watt clear-channel signal.  Inner City Broadcasting purchased the Fort Wayne station in 1994 for the sole purpose of lowering its power in order to increase WLIB's, setting the stage for WLIB to eventually begin broadcasting around the clock.  After gaining Federal Communications Commission approval for 24-hour broadcasting, it would still be a few years before WLIB would actually begin nighttime programming.  In the meantime Inner City sold WOWO, whose nighttime signal is now greatly reduced.

Politics
Since becoming Black-owned the station has broadcast political, Afrocentric, and health-centered programming aimed at New York's Caribbean American community. WLIB's advocacy strength was credited with getting out the vote for David Dinkins in 1989 as he ran to become New York City's first black mayor.

In 2004, the station affiliated with Air America Radio due to a lack of advertiser support and ratings during its daytime hours. The switch was controversial, with many in the community seeing the switch as replacing local black activist programming with Air America network's national, primarily white, liberal on-air personalities. Air America programming, which featured shows hosted by Al Franken, Randi Rhodes and Rachel Maddow, aired most of the day over WLIB with the exception of overnights, when the station aired the Global Black Experience, hosted by Imhotep Gary Byrd. Starting in 2005, the apolitical Satellite Sisters aired instead of the Mike Malloy show on WLIB from 10 p.m. to midnight on weeknights.

Air America programming left WLIB after August 31, 2006; the network moved to WWRL the next day. It was rumored that the Progressive talk radio format would be retained using local hosts and syndicated talker Ed Schultz, under a lease agreement with Randy Michaels' company, Radioactive, LLC. However negotiations fell through, and on August 21, 2006, WLIB announced that they would switch to a gospel music format.

Sale to Emmis
Following Inner City Broadcasting's bankruptcy in 2012, WLIB and WBLS (and Inner City's other station properties) were acquired by YMF Media LLC, owned jointly by investor Ronald Burkle and former professional basketball player Earvin "Magic" Johnson. Over the next two years YMF sold off all of Inner City's stations; on February 11, 2014, Emmis Communications announced its purchase of WLIB and WBLS for $131 million. Emmis began operating the stations under a local marketing agreement until receiving final approval from the FCC, which came on June 10, 2014.

References

External links
FCC History Cards for WLIB
 

LIB
Radio stations established in 1941
Gospel radio stations in the United States
Emmis Communications radio stations
Hudson Square
LIB